Loudon Road may refer to:

 South Hampstead railway station, London, UK—known as Loudon Road between 1879 and 1922.
 Loudon Road Historic District, Albany County, New York, US.